The Kannada flag, a strip of yellow and red, symbolises both Kannada and Karnataka, although it doesn't have any official status and it isn't recognized as a state flag by the Government of India.

the yellow and red colours in the flag stand for Arashina (Turmeric) and Kumkuma (Vermilion).

These two substances signify auspiciousness and well-being in Karnataka and among Kannada people. It is hoisted every year by the Chief Minister of Karnataka on Karnataka Rajyotsava (November 1).

Government banner
The Government of Karnataka is represented by a banner that depicts the emblem of the state on a white background.

History

Vijayanagara Empire 

The Vijayanagara Empire was a Hindu empire based in South India, which consisted the modern states of Karnataka, Andhra Pradesh, Tamil Nadu, Kerala, Goa and some parts of Telangana and Maharashtra. the (Varaha) were identified with royal insignia of the Vijayanagara kings.

Kingdom of Mysore (1880s–1974) 

The present-day state of Karnataka went through a series of geopolitical and cultural transformations. After India's independence in 1947, the constitutional changes took nearly three years to come into effect, during which the Kingdom of Mysore remained the state's original form territorially. In 1950, the Kingdom of Mysore was renamed the Mysore State when India became a democratic republic, but Maharaja Jayachamarajendra Wadiyar continued to be the chief head of the Mysore State (as maharaja, then as rajpramukh, and finally as governor). In 1956, the 1956 States Reorganisation Act was passed, which furthered the Mysore State's frontiers. Coastal parts of Mangalore, which previously belonged to Madras Presidency, were incorporated into the Mysore State, as well as Kannada-speaking regions of the Bombay Presidency (sometimes referred to as Bombay-Karnataka region) and the Hyderabad State). In 1974, the Mysore State was renamed Karnataka. Until this point, the flag of the Kingdom of Mysore remained the state's flag, official until 1956, and de facto thereafter, until 1974, alongside the bi-coloured Kannada flag. With the renaming of state, pro-Kannada movements throughout Karnataka gained pace, during which the bi-coloured Kannada flag became more prevalent.

The flag of the Kingdom of Mysore was oblong and bi-coloured: a red strip on the top, symbolising vermilion, and a maroon strip on the bottom. In the centre was inscribed its coat of arms. Some synonymous versions of the flag redact the emblem; the original version, however, comes with it inscribed in the centre. The coat of arms bore a mythical two-headed eagle, called Gandabherunda in Kannada. This emblem itself was an adoption from that of the Vijayanagara Empire. the Kingdom of Mysore inherited this right after the principality was commissioned in 1399 by Harihara II, anointing Yaduraya Wodeyar as its ruler.

After the state's renaming in 1974, this flag was gradually decommissioned. Nevertheless, this flag remains, to this day, the official flag of the Mysore royal family, and is used during the private and, sometimes, in public, celebrations of the Dasara festival, including the Special Assembly (Khas Durbar) during the carnival.

Kingdom of Mysore Under Haider Ali and Tipu Sultan (1761–1799) 

In the second half of the 18th century, the Maharajas of Mysore were reduced to the role of puppet rulers, with the real power held by the Muslims.

At least 3 flags are known from this period. Hyder Ali standard from the Battle of Sholinghur 1781 captured by the Madras Regiment. White with a red border, with five red disks was the naval flag used from c. 1784 to 1799, the year of Tipu Sultan's defeat by the British. The weak and primitive local navy disintegrated at the first serious clash with European ships, and with it the flag disappeared. Another flag is a green triangle with gold symbols seen in one of James Hunter's paintings.

Jamkhandi State 
the Jamkhandi State was one of the Maratha princely states of British India. It was founded in 1811 and its capital was at Jamakhandi.

State flag used until 1948. The state coat of arms without colors appeared on a plain saffron background. An oval shield with a ritual ax flanked by two torches placed on the bordure. Around the shield, supported by two draped elephants with a flag in their trunks, were various figures: above the sun and moon, below various weapons and a scroll with the name of the country.

Mudhol State 

the Mudhol State was a princely state during the British Raj. The rulers were from the Ghorpade clan of the Marathas. It was one of the former states of the Southern Maratha Country and its capital was the city of Mudhol.

Ramdurg State 

the Ramdurg State was one of the Maratha princely states ruled by the Bhave family during the British Raj. It was administered as part of the Deccan States Agency of the Bombay Presidency, founded in 1799. It was one of the former states of the Southern Maratha Country and its capital was at Ramdurg.

National flag adopted at an unknown date and abolished in 1948. the Bhagwa Dhwaj (deep indented square), usually worn with a large orange ribbon. It was also the banner of the ruler.

Sandur State 

the Sandur State was a princely state of India during the British Raj, part of the Madras States Agency. Its capital was the town of Sanduru.

State flag adopted at an unknown date and abolished with the state in 1949. Proportions 4/7. The orange field signified the descent of the ruling dynasty from the Maratha Empire. The black and white canton was taken from the insignia of the Armed Forces. Another flag of Sandur, considered a royal flag, featured an emblem consisting of a sun with an umbrella and a lizard on an Bhagwa Dhwaj. The umbrella and the lizard are the crest and badge of the principality's coat of arms respectively. The same emblem appeared on the war flag, it was a white triangle with two black stripes above and below it.There is no evidence to link the design of the national flag with the similar design of the old Georgian flag.

Kannada flag

The Kannada flag is a flag that is in popular use in Karnataka. It is widely identified with Karnataka, Kannadigas and the Kannada language. The flag does not represent separatist ideology and was used Kannada-centric organisations and private individuals to show solidarity with Kannada causes and demonstrate their unity. It finds a place in the official website of the Government of Karnataka.

History

The Kannada Movement, Chaluvali, is a result of various socio-political issues that rocked the capital in the early part of the 20th century. The British established the Cantonment and brought a large number of Tigalas from the Madras Presidency to work. When the plague killed a large number of people at the end of the 19th century, the two major textile mills in Bengaluru were closed down. After three decades, they were restarted and workers from Arcot were brought in. Added to that population were the officials in the British government who were all from Tamil Nadu. The local language was pushed to a corner as all of them were using their mother tongue.

It was only in 1909 when M. Visvesvaraya became the dewan that a Mysuru Economics Conference was established for integrated development of the Kingdom of Mysore and R. H. Deshpande, founder of the Karnataka Vidyavardhaka Sangha in Dharwad, suggested a Servants of Karnataka Society, similar to the Servants of India Society to safeguard the interests of Kannada. This was the actual beginning of the Kannada Sahitya Parishat in 1915. Following an advertisement in the newspaper calling invitations from “painters for Bangalore municipality, knowledge of Tamil and Telugu compulsory”, writer A. N. Krishna Rao and his band of followers launched a Kannada movement.

In 1962, a Bengaluru Kannadiga conference was held at the Mysuru Commerce Bhavan inaugurated by Kengal Hanumanthaiah and attended by a number of stalwarts like Gubbi Veeranna, Khadri Shamanna, Ma Ramamurthy, and K. R. Seetharama Sastry, who formulated several actions plans to safeguard Kannada in the capital. Gradually the movement took the momentum and several incidents during that time shed interesting insights. For instance, when the 1963 Tamil film Kaanchi Thalaivan showed the war between Chalukya and Pallava, a scene in which the king stamps on the Kannada flag, created a lot of dissentment among Kannada activists, and a special screening was arranged at Minerva theater for all writers, artists, eminent personalities to give their opinion. There were heated exchanges of words between the exhibitors and the people. But the result was the unification of Kannada activists. In 1964, the government declared a state holiday for a cricket match between MCC and Presidents’ XI and refused to declare November 1 a holiday. Protests and subsequent developments resulted in the Karnataka Rajyotsava being declared a state holiday. M. Ramamurthy went on a Padayatra, protesting against the hoisting of flags from neighboring state parties in the capital and soon he realized Kannadigas did not have a flag to hoist. He designed a flag that was yellow, a Karnataka map, and a paddy crown in the center. Since everybody wanted a simple flag, the current yellow and red flag was adopted. The yellow color represents ‘Arisina’ (Turmeric) and the red color represents ‘Kumkuma’ of Goddess Bhuvaneshwari. The flag is in popular use all over Karnataka to represent Karnataka and Kannada.

The Kannada Movement also has seen several agitations like the Gokak agitation, the demand for a Bengaluru Kannada TV channel and many others. In all these agitations, the Kannada flag has been the symbol of the unity of Kannadigas.

In 2009, B. S. Yeddyurappa, then Chief Minister of Karnataka, issued a circular enforcing restrictions on hoisting the Kannada flag on government buildings. Later, this move was challenged in the Karnataka High Court in 2012 after then Chief Minister D. V. Sadananda Gowda mentioned in his budget speech that the hoisting of the Kannada flag on 1 November will be made compulsory in all government offices, schools, and colleges.

Kodava flag

The Kodava people are an ethno-linguistic group from the Kodagu district in the southern Indian state of Karnataka, who natively speak the Kodava language. There is no universal design for the Kodava flag, however, all flags created to represent the Kodava people feature a crossed knife, knife scabbard, and rifle emblem. The choice of these elements is due to the special place that weapons occupy in Kodava culture.

See also
 Emblem of Karnataka
 Jaya Bharata Jananiya Tanujate
 National flag of India
 List of Indian state flags

References

Flags of India
Government of Karnataka
2018 in India
Karnataka
Karnataka